Syed Arif Hussain Al Hussaini (November 25, 1946 - August 5, 1988) was an Islamic religious leader of Shia Muslims in Pakistan and founder of Shia Islamist Movement Tehrik-e-Jafaria in Pakistan.He also known as Khomanei-e-Pakistan.

Early life 
Arif Hussain al-Hussaini was born on 25 November 1946 in the Village Piwaar of Kurram District, Parachinar into the house of Fazal Hussain Shah. His family belongs to the Husseini branch of Syeds, which trace descent to the fourth Shi'a imam, Zayn al-‘Ābidīn. The specific local branch name was Duparzai.  Arif received his primary education at his home town government primary school and later went on to Parachinar to complete his matriculation.  Later he got admission into the Madressa Jafria Parachinar from where he went to the Iraqi city of Najaf for further studies, where he also studied under Ayatollah Khomeini in Iraq.  In 1973 he returned home and married, and a year later went to the holy city of Qom, Iran to join the Hauza Ilmia.  In 1975 and 1977 he went on Haj. Due to his involvement  in District Kurram and also for Madressah-e-Jaffaria in Parachinar, Abid Hussain al Hussaini called him for help.

He was sent back to Pakistan in 1977 to mobilize the Shia community, and also in that year was the first person to recite a majlis in Pashto, unusual in that the great majority of Pashtuns are Sunni rather than Shia. He also leveraged funding from the Shia Pakistani diaspora in the Persian Gulf to create the Alamdar Foundation in his hometown of Parachinar.

Leadership of Tehrik-e-Jafaria Pakistan 
In a meeting of 28 persons called in Bhakkar, Punjab, Arif Hussain was given the leadership of Tehrik-e-Jafaria Pakistan, five months after the death of Mufti Jafar Hussain on February 10, 1984, in Bhakkar.

Assassination 
Hussaini died in Peshawar on August 5, 1988. He was at the stairs of his seminary, coming down from his residence at first floor, when assailants opened fire at him. The attackers escaped but were later arrested. Hussaini died of his wounds while being transported by ambulance to a local hospital.

His body was taken from Peshawar to his native village of Peiwar by helicopter. The former President General Muhammad Zia-ul-Haq and special representatives of Imam Khomeini, Ayatullah Jannati, participated in his funeral rites. The Iranian government supported the construction of a mazar over his grave in Peshawar.

See also
 Mufti Jafar Hussain
 Syed Jawad Naqvi
 Muhammad Hussain Najafi
 Muhammad Nawaz Irfani
 Sheikh Rajab Ali
 Sheikh Ali Madad
 Sheikh Fida Hussain Muzahiri

References

Pakistani Shia clerics
Pakistani Shia Muslims
Pakistani Islamists
Pashtun people
People from Kurram District
Deaths by firearm in Khyber Pakhtunkhwa
1946 births
1988 deaths
Islamic Dawa Party
Assassinated Pakistani people